William Andrew Hart (1904–1992) was a Scottish Roman Catholic clergyman who served as the Bishop of Dunkeld from 1955 to 1981.

Born in Dumbarton, Scotland on 9 September 1904, he was educated at St Mary's College, Blairs 1919-1922 and the Royal Scots College, Valladolid 1922-1929. He was ordained to the priesthood on 25 May 1929 at Valladolid Cathedral for Glasgow Archdiocese. He was curate of St Mary's, Hamilton 1929-1933 and St John's, Gorbals 1933-1939. He served as a forces chaplain from 1939 to 1945 and was curate of St Michael's, Parkhead 1945-1948. He was Vice-rector of the Royal Scots College, Valladolid 1948-1949. He returned to Scotland in 1949 as parish priest of St Nicholas', Glasgow. He was parish priest of St Saviour's, Govan 1951-1955.

He was appointed the Bishop of the Diocese of Dunkeld by the Holy See on 27 May 1955, and consecrated to the Episcopate on 21 September 1955. The principal consecrator was Archbishop Donald Alphonsus Campbell of Glasgow, and the principal co-consecrators were Bishop James Black of Paisley and Bishop Joseph Michael McGee of Galloway. He attended all four sessions of the Second Vatican Council from 1962 to 1965.

He retired on 26 January 1981 and assumed the title Bishop Emeritus of Dunkeld. He died on 18 October 1992, aged 88.

References

1904 births
1992 deaths
People from Dumbarton
20th-century Roman Catholic bishops in Scotland
Bishops of Dunkeld (Roman Catholic, Post-Reformation)
Scottish Roman Catholic bishops